Ephippigerida is a genus of European bush crickets in the tribe Ephippigerini, first described by Ignacio Bolívar in 1903 as Uromenus (Ephippigerida).  To date (2022) species have only been recorded from the Iberian peninsula.

Species 
The Orthoptera Species File lists:
subgenus Ephippigerida Bolívar, 1903
 Ephippigerida areolaria (Bolívar, 1877) - type species (as Ephippiger areolarius Bolívar, by subsequent designation)
 Ephippigerida asella Navás, 1907
 Ephippigerida carinata (Bolívar, 1877)
 Ephippigerida diluta (Bolívar, 1878)
 Ephippigerida longicauda (Bolívar, 1873)
 Ephippigerida marceti Navás, 1907
 Ephippigerida pantingana (Navás, 1904)
 Ephippigerida rosae Barat & Correas, 2015
 Ephippigerida saussuriana (Bolívar, 1878)
subgenus Lobionifera Barat & Correas, 2015
 Ephippigerida laserena Barat & Correas, 2015
subgenus Parisia Domenech Fernández, 2022
 Ephippigerida barati Domenech Fernández, 2022

References

External links 

Orthoptera of Europe
Ensifera genera
Bradyporinae